The "Swallow Song of Rhodes" is a famous ancient Greek folk song. In a tradition closely resembling the modern custom of trick-or-treating, during the month of Boedromion, the children on the Greek island of Rhodes would go out dressed as swallows and beg from door to door, singing the song. The song is preserved by the ancient Greek writer, Athenaeus of Naucratis, in his book, The Deipnosophists. On the Attic calendar, the month of Boedromion took place in early autumn. It usually began around mid-September and ended sometime around mid-October. On the Rhodian calendar, however, the month seems to have taken place in early spring. The tradition was claimed to have been started by the Rhodian lawgiver Cleobulus.

The melody to the song has not survived. All that has survived of the song are the lyrics themselves. The full text of the song in Ancient Greek and in English translation is as follows:

External links
Came, came the swallow... 
The Deipnosophists, or, Banquet of the learned, of Athenæus, Volume 2  - VIII 360 cd

References

Ancient Greek songs
Songs about birds
Songs about Greece
Greek children's songs
Greek folk songs
Ancient Rhodes
Year of song unknown
Songwriter unknown